Olle Danielsson (20 April 1912 – 12 October 1999) was a Swedish sprinter. He competed in the men's 400 metres at the 1936 Summer Olympics.

References

1912 births
1999 deaths
Athletes (track and field) at the 1936 Summer Olympics
Swedish male sprinters
Olympic athletes of Sweden
Place of birth missing
20th-century Swedish people